Putrajaya, officially the Federal Territory of Putrajaya, is a administrative capital and the judicial capital of Malaysia. The seat of the federal government of Malaysia was moved in 1999 from Kuala Lumpur to Putrajaya because of overcrowding and congestion in the former, whilst the seat of the judiciary of Malaysia was later moved to Putrajaya in 2003. Kuala Lumpur remains as Malaysia's national capital city per the constitution and is still the seat of the head of state (Yang di-Pertuan Agong) and the national legislature (Parliament of Malaysia), as well as being the country's commercial and financial centre.

The establishment of Putrajaya was the idea of the then-Prime Minister Mahathir Mohamad. The development of Putrajaya began in August 1995 and it was completed at an estimated cost of US$8.1 billion. On February 1, 2001, Putrajaya became Malaysia's third federal territory, after Kuala Lumpur in 1974 and Labuan in 1984. Putrajaya is also a part of MSC Malaysia, a special economic zone that covers Klang Valley.

Etymology 
Putrajaya was named after the first Prime Minister of Malaysia, Tunku Abdul Rahman Putra Al-Haj; the territory is entirely enclaved within the Sepang District of the state of Selangor. The etymology of the city is derived from the Sanskrit language, which was then adopted into Malay; "putra" (पुत्र) means son and "jaya" (जया) means "success" or "victory"; hence Putrajaya means victorious men or people.

History and design 

Prang Besar (Jawi: , alternately Perang Besar (Malay for "Great War"), was founded in 1921 on land that was jungle, as a rubber plantation by British veterans of World War I, hence the name.

Until 1975, what is today Putrajaya, along with adjacent Cyberjaya, was under the administration of Hulu Langat (Kajang) district.

The vision of a new Federal Government Administrative Centre to replace Kuala Lumpur as the administrative capital emerged in the late 1980s, during the tenure of Malaysia's fourth prime minister, Mahathir bin Mohamad. A new city adjacent to Kuala Lumpur was envisioned, where the government would systematically locate its government offices within an efficient administrative hub; as opposed to the past where government offices were previously scattered across the congested Kuala Lumpur. The new city was proposed to be located between Kuala Lumpur and the new Kuala Lumpur International Airport (KLIA). Two areas were proposed: Prang Besar and Janda Baik of Pahang. The new name  was chosen for the site.

The federal government negotiated with the state of Selangor on the prospect of another federal territory. As a result of this land purchase, Selangor now surrounds two federal territories within its borders: Kuala Lumpur and Putrajaya.

Planned as a garden city and intelligent city, 38% of the area is green spaces in which the natural landscape is enhanced.  The plan incorporated a network of open spaces and wide boulevards. Construction began in August 1995; it was Malaysia's biggest project and one of Southeast Asia's largest, with an estimated final cost of US$8.1 billion. The entire project was designed and constructed by Malaysian companies, with only 10% imported materials. 

The Asian Financial Crisis of 1997/1998 somewhat slowed the development of Putrajaya. 300 members of the Prime Minister's office staff moved there in 1999, and the remaining government servants moved in 2005. On 1 February 2001, the city was formally transferred to the federal government and declared Malaysia's third federal territory.

In 2002, a rail line called KLIA Transit was opened, linking Putrajaya to KLIA in Sepang. The construction of the Putrajaya Monorail, which was intended to be the city's metro system, was suspended owing to high costs. One of the monorail suspension bridges in Putrajaya remains unused.

In April 2013, the Putrajaya government signed a letter of intent (LOI) with the government of Sejong City in South Korea to mark co-operation between the two cities.

Government and politics
, all of Malaysia's governmental ministries had relocated to Putrajaya. Government ministries and bodies remaining in Kuala Lumpur include the Ministry of International Trade and Industry (MITI), Ministry of Defence (MINDEF) and Ministry of Works (KKR), as well as Bank Negara Malaysia and Royal Malaysian Police. The Parliament of Malaysia also remained in Kuala Lumpur, as well as the Yang di-Pertuan Agong (King) of Malaysia. Foreign embassies and missions except Brunei still remain in Kuala Lumpur.

The local government in Putrajaya is the responsibility of the Putrajaya Corporation (Perbadanan Putrajaya), a unique local authority. Previously it was administered by the Sepang District Council.

Putrajaya is represented in the Parliament of Malaysia by one elected MP in the Dewan Rakyat, under the seat of Putrajaya, as well as one appointed senator in the Dewan Negara.

As with the other federal territories of Malaysia, Putrajaya does not have a territorial legislature.

Demographics

Population

In 2007 the population of Putrajaya was estimated to be over 30,000, which comprised mainly government servants. Government public servants have been encouraged to relocate to the city through various government subsidy and loan programs. The population had increased to 88,300 by 2015.

Religious demography

, the population of Putrajaya is 97.2% Muslim, 1.1% Hindu, 0.8% Christian, 0.5% Buddhist, 0.4% unknown and 0.1% other religions. The Malaysian constitution strictly defines what makes a "Malay" as an individual who professes Islam, speak Malay regularly, practises Malay customs, and has lived in or has ancestors from Indonesia, Brunei, Malaysia, and Singapore.

Infrastructure
Most of the infrastructures in Putrajaya adopt Middle-Eastern architectural designs, which symbolises Malaysian Islamic Identity.

Government complexes

Perdana Putra – Prime Minister's office
Seri Perdana – The official residence of the Prime Minister
Seri Satria – The official residence of the Deputy Prime Minister
Palace of Justice – The seat of the national judiciary (Federal Court and the Court of Appeals)
Ministry of Finance
Wisma Putra – Ministry of Foreign Affairs
Istana Melawati - Palace of the Yang di-Pertuan Agong
Istana Darul Ehsan - Palace of the Sultan of Selangor
Putrajaya International Convention Centre
Perdana Leadership Foundation

Infrastructure and places of worship
Alamanda Putrajaya Shopping Centre - the only shopping mall within Putrajaya
Heritage Square
Putrajaya Corporation Square
Selera Putra
Souq Putrajaya
Pusat Kejiranan Presint 9
Pusat Kejiranan Presint 16
Putra Mosque
Tuanku Mizan Zainal Abidin Mosque
PUSPANITAPURI (Persatuan Kesejahteraan Rakyat Malaysia)

Monuments
Putrajaya Landmark
Millennium Monument
National Heroes Square

Open spaces
Putrajaya Lake
Putra Square
Putrajaya Wetlands Park
Taman Selatan
Putrajaya Botanical Gardens – The biggest botanical garden in Malaysia, covering an area over 92 hectares

Educational institutions
Kindergarten and Pre-School
 Brainy Bunch International Montessori (Presint 14)

Primary & Secondary Education in Putrajaya is provided by a few schools such as:
SK Putrajaya Presint 5 (1)
SK Putrajaya Presint 8 (1)
SK Putrajaya Presint 8 (2)
SK Putrajaya Presint 9 (1)
SK Putrajaya Presint 9 (2)
SK Putrajaya Presint 11 (1)
SK Putrajaya Presint 11 (2)
SK Putrajaya Presint 11 (3)
SK Putrajaya Presint 14 (1)
SK Putrajaya Presint 16 (1)
SK Putrajaya Presint 16 (2)
SK Putrajaya Presint 17 (1)
SK Putrajaya Presint 18 (1)
SK Putrajaya Presint 18 (2)
SMK Putrajaya Presint 5 (1)
SMK Putrajaya Presint 8 (1)
SMK Putrajaya Presint 9
SMK Putrajaya Presint 9 (2)
SMK Putrajaya Presint 11 (1)
SMK Putrajaya Presint 11 (2)
SMK Putrajaya Presint 14 (1)
SMK Putrajaya Presint 16 (1)
SMK Putrajaya Presint 18 (1)

There are also two elite fully residential schools in Putrajaya:
Sekolah Sultan Alam Shah
Sekolah Menengah Kebangsaan Agama Putrajaya (SMAPUTRA)

Other universities:
 Heriot-Watt University Malaysia has a campus in Precinct 5.

International Schools
 Nexus International School, Presint 15.
 The International Modern Arabic School, Presint 14.

Transport
Putrajaya is home to the world's largest roundabout, the Persiaran Sultan Salahuddin Abdul Aziz Shah with a perimeter of 3.5 km. (2.7 miles)

By car

Major highways 
Putrajaya is surrounded by federal highways 29 on the western side and 30 on the eastern side. The South Klang Valley Expressway E26, connecting Pulau Indah to Kajang, runs through the northern end of Putrajaya. ELITE E6 exit 607 serves Putrajaya and also nearby Cyberjaya. Highway 29 interchanges with Damansara–Puchong Expressway (LDP) E11 in the northwestern corner of Putrajaya, linking the city with Puchong, Subang Jaya, Kelana Jaya and to Kepong.

Within Putrajaya, the following roads serve as the main thoroughfares of the city.
Persiaran Persekutuan
Persiaran Sultan Salahuddin Abdul Aziz Shah (The world's largest roundabout with a diameter of 3.5 km (2.2 miles))
Persiaran Utara
Lebuh Sentosa
Persiaran Barat
Persiaran Selatan
Persiaran Timur
Persiaran Perdana (Boulevard)

List of road bridges

Seri Perdana Bridge
Putra Bridge
Seri Wawasan Bridge
Seri Bakti Bridge
Seri Saujana Bridge
Seri Bestari Bridge
Seri Setia Bridge
Seri Gemilang Bridge

Public transport

Rail
The only direct rail connection to Putrajaya is the  KLIA Transit line through the  Putrajaya & Cyberjaya station within the Putrajaya Sentral transportation hub, which connects to KL Sentral, Bandar Tasik Selatan, Salak Tinggi, KLIA and klia2. The  MRT Putrajaya Line, ending at Putrajaya Sentral. Will open on 16 March 2023.

The proposed  Kuala Lumpur–Singapore High Speed Rail will also connect to Putrajaya along the route from Kuala Lumpur to Singapore but will be located near the borders of Putrajaya, in nearby Presint 14.

Around 2003, plans for a monorail in Putrajaya were under construction but were halted due to low population. However, plans to revive the construction of the  Putrajaya Monorail, with proposed connections to Kajang, Bandar Baru Bangi and Cyberjaya, are currently underway.

Buses
Putrajaya Corporation provides its own stage bus services through its subsidiary Nadi Putra using natural gas-powered buses and a few electric buses. The bus service serves the entirety of Putrajaya as well as Cyberjaya and provides express bus routes to Kuala Lumpur through Puduraya and a few other nearby cities from its hubs at Putrajaya Sentral, and P&R Presint 14. Bus stops in Putrajaya are very common too and serves Nadi Putra. Rapid KL, Causeway Link and Cityliner also provides bus services to other areas from Putrajaya Sentral such as Banting, Puchong, Bandar Utama and Petaling Jaya.

Intercity buses also serve bus routes from Putrajaya Sentral to the northern states.

International relations

Twin towns and sister cities 
Putrajaya is twinned with these cities:
  Cyberjaya, Malaysia
  Astana, Kazakhstan
  Sejong City, South Korea

Climate
Putrajaya has a tropical rainforest climate (Af) with heavy rainfall year-round and high temperatures throughout the year. Typical cities, towns, and other geographical regions with this climate, Putrajaya does not have a true dry season. The average temperature in Putrajaya is 27.1 °C, which is measured at approximately 80.8 °F. Over the course of a yearly period, the rainfall averages 2307 mm in Putrajaya, which is approximately 90.8 inches.

Image gallery

See also

 List of countries with multiple capitals

References
Citations

General

Further reading
 King, Ross: Kuala Lumpur and Putrajaya: Negotiating Urban Space in Malaysia, Nias Press, 2008

External links

 
 

 
Federal Territories in Malaysia
Peninsular Malaysia
MSC Malaysia
Planned capitals
Planned cities in Malaysia
Suburbs in Kuala Lumpur
Enclaves and exclaves
Populated places established in 1995
1995 establishments in Malaysia
Cities in Malaysia